Salty Air is a 2006 Italian drama film written and directed by Alessandro Angelini and starring Giorgio Pasotti, Giorgio Colangeli and Michela Cescon.

The film entered the competition at the 2006 Rome Film Festival, in which Giorgio Colangeli won the award for best actor. For his performance Colangeli also won the David di Donatello for Best Supporting Actor.

Plot 
Fabio, who works as an educator in the prison of Rebibbia, finds by chance his father, Luigi Sparta, who was convicted of murder and is now pretending to be epileptic in order to obtain the libertà condizionata. Fabio and Luigi have not been seen since the man  abandoned his son, when he was only six years old.

Cast 

 Giorgio Pasotti as Fabio
 Giorgio Colangeli as Luigi Sparti
 Michela Cescon as Cristina
  Katy Louise Saunders as  Emma
  Sergio Solli as Lodi
 Paolo De Vita  as Umberto Sparti 
 Paolo Pierobon  as Brunetti

Reception
In her review for Variety, film critic Deborah Young called the film "the Italian debut of the year, at least as for critics" and referred to it as a film which "hits fever pitch early and never pauses for a moment of softness or to let the story breathe".

References

External links

Italian drama films
2006 drama films
Films set in Italy
2006 directorial debut films
2006 films
Italian prison films